The 2020 UCI Oceania Tour was the 16th season of the UCI Oceania Tour. The season began on 15 January 2020 with the New Zealand Cycle Classic and finished on 9 February 2020 with the Herald Sun Tour.

Throughout the season, points were awarded to the top finishers of stages within stage races and the final general classification standings of each of the stages races and one-day events. The quality and complexity of a race also determined how many points were awarded to the top finishers, the higher the UCI rating of a race, the more points were awarded.
The UCI ratings from highest to lowest were are as follows:
 Multi-day events: 2.1 and 2.2
 One-day events: 1.1 and 1.2

Teams
The seven teams which competed in the 2020 tour were:

Events

Due to the ongoing impact and restrictions associated with the global COVID-19 pandemic, the Tour of Brisbane, which was to include the 2020 Oceania Road Championships will not take place in 2020.

References

External links
 

 
UCI Oceania Tour
UCI Oceania Tour
UCI Oceania Tour